AG Soka Shinsho Church is commonly called as Riverside Chapel both domestically and internationally. Riverside Chapel stands on an orthodox faith. It is an evangelical Protestant church and is affiliated with the Japan Evangelical Association (JEA).

History
1991 Assemblies of God Church sets up an evangelism center in Soka city, Saitama prefecture. Rev. Hiromasa Amano, a graduate of Central Bible College (CBC) and an appointed minister of the Assemblies, is sent as a church planter to Soka.
1992 The center comes under the direct supervision of the Japan Assemblies of God. Missionary candidates are sent to the center from overseas. (Americans and British from YWAM) A graduate from Canada's Eastern Pentecostal Bible College is sent. An English conversation school is set up; many students go in and out of the pioneer church.
1993 – The church holds education seminars in the city's public hall and community center. (The speakers were a head of a Christian university, a school headmaster, etc.) Out of the people who were led to the seminars, many people accepted the Christian faith, and the basis of the church was established.
1994 Many children attend the Church School (CS), which is what the Sunday school is called. A service for foreigners (English Service) is started. A Canadian missionary is officially appointed.
1996 Matsubara Chapel (or Sanctuary) is rented, and its use as the second chapel starts. A service for Filipinos (Tagalog Service) is started.
1997 Services for Brazilians (Portuguese Service) and Koreans (Korean Service) are started.
1998 Along with the start of the various international services, the church as a whole is built up as an international church. The sought-after revival is experienced on a small scale. Many people come from all over Japan to seek the Lord. Along with this, many people are baptized and/or commit themselves to full-time ministry. As a result, Holy Spirit Bible School (HSBS) is started.
2001 Team ministry (by multiple ministers who can care pastorally) is started. Church planting and pioneering multiplies domestically and overseas.
2004 Riverside International School (RIS), for elementary to high school grades, is established within the church with a consistent curriculum tailored to the purposes of the school.
2006 Shalom House, Gloria House, Eternal, Joyful, and Hallelujah buildings are provided and put to use.
2008 A learning and training school for church members (HSTS) is started. Future workers are nurtured.
2010 Attains rights and status as an independent corporation from Saitama Prefecture. Expands to 14 bases domestically, including Asakusa Chapel, Okayama Tsudaka Church, Yashio Chapel, etc., and 25 bases overseas. Pioneer evangelism is done through church planting, mainly by evangelists and missionaries that were trained in Soka. The various bases are pushing forward and growing into evangelism centers or independent churches.
2011 20th anniversary since the pioneering work began.

See also
Japan Assemblies of God

External links
AG Soka Shinsho Church HP (Japanese)

Churches in Japan